Maria Fernandez may refer to:

María Fernández (footballer) (María Fernández Almenar, born 1985), footballer
María Lucía Fernández (born 1968), Colombian  journalist and news presenter
María Luisa Fernández (swimmer) (born 1969), Spanish swimmer
María Luisa Fernández (writer) (1870–1938), Chilean writer
María Teresa Fernández de la Vega (born 1949), Spanish politician
Isabel Fernández (judoka) (María Isabel Fernández; born 1972), Spanish judoka
María Pilar Fernández (born 1962), Spanish sport shooter
María Calderón Fernandez (born 1997), Spanish cyclist
Pepa Fernández (born 1965), Spanish journalist
María Ángeles Fernández Lebrato (born 1970), Spanish Paralympic cyclist and swimmer

See also
Maria Fernandes (born 1969), Portuguese Paralympic athlete
Maria Helena Rosas Fernandes, Brazilian composer
Maria Celestina Fernandes, Angolan children's author